The World Figure Skating Championships is an annual figure skating competition sanctioned by the International Skating Union in which figure skaters compete for the title of World Champion.

The 1954 competitions for men, ladies, pair skating, and ice dancing took place from February 16 to 19 in Oslo, Norway.

Results

Men

Judges:
 Hans Meixner 
 Melville Rogers 
 Jacques Favart 
 A. D. C. Gordon 
 H. G. Storke

Ladies

Judges:
 F. Heinlein 
 Melville Rogers 
 F. Grimminger 
 J. Wilson 
 Bruno Bonfiglio 
 P. Reinertsen 
 H. G. Storke

Pairs

Judges:
 H. Grünauer 
 Melville Rogers 
 F. Grimminger 
 Pamela Devis 
 E. Kirchhofer 
 B. Holmberg 
 H. G. Storke

Ice dancing

Judges:
 Hans Meixner 
 H. Meudec 
 Pamela Davis 
 E. Kirchhofer 
 M. Drake

Sources
 Result List provided by the ISU

World Figure Skating Championships
World Figure Skating Championships
World Figure Skating Championships
International figure skating competitions hosted by Norway
1954 in Norwegian sport
International sports competitions in Oslo
February 1954 sports events in Europe
1950s in Oslo